Delnon is a surname. Notable people with the surname include:

Georges Delnon (born 1958), Swiss theatre director, artistic director, and professor
Reto Delnon (1924–1983), Swiss ice hockey player and coach

See also
Delmon (disambiguation)